KKJB (channel 39) is a television station in Boise, Idaho, United States, affiliated with the Spanish-language Telemundo network. It is owned by Cocola Broadcasting alongside six low-power stations. KKJB's transmitter is located north of the city in the Boise National Forest.

History
KKJB signed on the air in July 2005 as an affiliate of America One. In 2009, the station switched its affiliation to Daystar. In 2014, KKJB changed its Daystar affiliation to Telemundo.

Technical information

Subchannels
The station's digital signal is multiplexed:

Analog-to-digital conversion
Because it was granted an original construction permit after the FCC finalized the DTV allotment plan on April 21, 1997, the station did not receive a companion channel for a digital television station. KKJB shut down its analog signal, over UHF channel 39, instead, on or before June 12, 2009. The station "flash-cut" its digital signal into operation UHF channel 39.

On November 30, 2018, KKJB switched from channel 39 to channel 15.

References

Television channels and stations established in 2005
2005 establishments in Idaho
Telemundo network affiliates
Cozi TV affiliates
Antenna TV affiliates
Buzzr affiliates
KJB